Officially named the AMP Centre, the AMP Place is a gold-coloured skyscraper located in the heart of the Brisbane central business district in Queensland, Australia. It can be seen from most parts of the city and is known locally as "The Gold Tower".

When the skyscraper was completed in 1978, it was Brisbane's tallest building. It consists of 35 floors and is 135 m (443 ft) high. The architects were Peddle Thorp & Walker.

In April 2021, CPP Investment Board and Dexus sold the building to Marquette.

See also

 List of tallest buildings in Brisbane

References

External links
 Emporis.com listing

Skyscrapers in Brisbane
Office buildings in Brisbane
Office buildings completed in 1978
Eagle Street, Brisbane
Skyscraper office buildings in Australia
1978 establishments in Australia